Cydia curiosa is a moth of the  family Tortricidae. It was described by Razowski in 2009 and is endemic to Vietnam.

The ground colour of the forewings is creamish brown, but partially cream in distal half, suffused and densely strigulated with brown. The hindwings are  brown.

Etymology
The name refers to curious habitus of this species.

References

Moths described in 2009
Endemic fauna of Vietnam
Grapholitini
Moths of Asia
Taxa named by Józef Razowski